The Little Yoho River is a short river in British Columbia that flows east from Kiwetinok Lake, which is the highest named lake in Canada, and into the Yoho River about  upstream from the mouth of the creek that Takakkaw Falls is on.  It is probably best known for Laughing Falls, an impressive plunge just above the river's mouth that is seen on the way to Twin Falls.

See also
List of British Columbia rivers

References 

Rivers of British Columbia
Yoho National Park
Rivers of the Canadian Rockies
Kootenay Land District